Michael McConnohie is an American voice actor, writer and director who has provided many voice roles in movies, anime, and video games. He and fellow actress Melodee Spevack run a production company called VoxWorks. Some of his major works include the Narrator on Bobobo-bo Bo-bobo and Hunter x Hunter,
The Necromancer in Diablo II, Azulongmon in Digimon, Gork in Masked Rider, Keiichi Ikari in Paranoia Agent, Rolf Emerson in Robotech, Manzou the Saw in Samurai Champloo, Cosmos and Tracks in Transformers, Hot Shot / Ironhide in Transformers: Robots in Disguise, D in Vampire Hunter D, Chief Inquisitor Margulis in Xenosaga and Charles zi Britannia in Code Geass.

Filmography

Anime 

 3×3 Eyes (Streamline Pictures dub) - Chou
 The Adventures of Manxmouse - Narrator
 Ajin - Teacher (Ep. 1)
 Aldnoah.Zero - Rayregalia Vers Rayvers
 Appleseed - General Edward Uranus III
 Argento Soma -  Funeral Unit Commander, Dignitary A, General
 Babel II - Emperor Yomi 
 The Big O - Schwarzwald/Michael Seebach
 Black Jack - Mangetsu Proprietor
 BlazBlue Alter Memory - Takamagahara
 Bleach - Chojiro Sasakibe, Ryūken Ishida, Kurodo, Shawlong Qufang, Toshimori Umesada, Danzomaru, Hiyosu, Shiroganehiko, Barragan Luisenbarn  (episodes 216+)
 Blue Dragon - King of Jibral
 Blue Exorcist - Tatsumasa Suguro, Additional Voices
 Bobobo-bo Bo-bobo - Narrator, Bobopatchiggler
 Captain Harlock and the Queen of a Thousand Years - Captain Harlock
 Code Geass - Charles zi Britannia
 Coppelion - Gennai Ishikawa
 Cowboy Bebop - Hospital Guard, Gate Company Chairman, Yuuri Kellerman, Punch (Big Shot Host)
 Crimson Wolf - Cell Guard, Driver
 Daigunder - Additional Voices
 Digimon Tamers - Azulongmon, Vajramon, Additional Voices
 Digimon Frontier - Additional Voices
 Digimon Data Squad - Cherrymon
 Dirty Pair - Mughi
 Dragon Ball - General Pei
 Dragon Ball Super - King Kai (Bang Zoom! dub for Toonami Asia)
 Eureka Seven - Captain Jurgens
 Ergo Proxy - Husserl, Police Dog
 Fafner - Kouzou Minashiro
 Fate/stay night - Berserker, Sorcerer, Tokiomi Tohsaka
 Flag - Base Commander, Newscaster, Operator, Traffic Controller, Tson, UN Press Officer
 Gargantia on the Verdurous Planet - Captain Fairlock
 Gatchaman (1994) - Dr Nambu
 Geneshaft - Cummings
 Ghost Talker's Daydream - Detective Yamazaki
 Ghost in the Shell: Stand Alone Complex - SWAT Chief
 Golgo 13: The Professional - Leonard Dawson
 Grimm's Fairy Tale Classics - Puss in Boots
 Gungrave - Big Daddy, Deed, Scott
 Gun X Sword - Baron Mayor (Ep. 2)
 Gurren Lagann - Rossiu (20 Years Later), Father Magin
 Haibane Renmei - The Communicator, the Baker
 Haré+Guu - Elder
 Hello Kitty's Paradise - Various
 Hellsing Ultimate - Wild Geese
 Honeybee Hutch - Additional Voices
 Hunter x Hunter - Narrator, Ship Captain (episodes 1–2), Mr. Battera
 Ikki Tousen - Kaya, Narrator
 Ikki Tousen: Great Guardians - Shizonsui
 Ikki Tousen: Xtreme Xecutor - Narrator, Shisonzui
 Immortal Grand Prix (microseries) - Dimmer
 Initial D (Tokyopop dub) - Yuichi Tachibana
 JoJo's Bizarre Adventure - Tonpetty, Messina
 JoJo's Bizarre Adventure: Stardust Crusaders - Impostor Captain Tennille
 Kamichu - Prime Minister, God of Select-O-Vision, Oyadama Kaze, Sunfish Grandpa
 Karas - Chief of Police
 Kaze no Yojimbo - Kanehara
 Kekkaishi - Heisuke Matsudo, Yoki, Yumeji Hisaomi
 Kikaider - Golden Bat
 Knights of Sidonia - Council Member (episodes 1–2, 6), Hiroki Saito (Ep. 7), Old Man (episodes 1–2, 7), Play-by-Play Commentator (Ep. 3)
 Kyo Kara Maoh! - Maxine
 Last Exile - Duke Henry Knowles; Gale; Prime Minister Marius, Additional Voices
 Lensman - Van Buskirk
 Lensman: Secret of the Lens - Van Buskirk
 Lensman: Power of the Lens - Van Buskirk
 MÄR - Babbo
 Mahoromatic - Uncle Sakura, VESPER Leader (Suguru's Grandfather, Yuichiro Konoe)
 Mao-chan - Rikushirou Onigawara
 Maple Town - Additional Voices
 Marmalade Boy - Cop; Master; Producer Takemura; Yoshimitsu Miwa
 Mars Daybreak - Poipoider, Niall Poe
 MegaMan Star Force - Wolf
 Melody of Oblivion - Bocca's father, Keiko's father, Mayor Sonada
 Mermaid Forest - Co-Worker, Old Gentleman
 Mermaid Saga - Rin's father
 Mirage of Blaze - Doctor, Kinue
 Mobile Suit Gundam (Movies I-III English Dub) - Ramba Ral
 Mobile Suit Gundam: The 08th MS Team - Norris Packard
 Mon Colle Knights - Various
 Monster - Dr. Boyer, Franz Bonaparta, Additional Voices
 Naruto - Enma
 Naruto: Shippuden - Hagoromo Ōtsutsuki
 Noein - Operator
 Noozles - Additional Voices
 Nura: Rise of the Yokai Clan series - Lord Sodemogi, Inugamigyōbu Danuki, Minagoroshi Jizo, Namahage
 Otogi Zoshi - Minamoto no Mitsunaka
 Outlaw Star - Fred's Bodyguard A
 Overman King Gainer - Yassaba Jin
 Paranoia Agent - Keiichi Ikari
 Phoenix - Old Masato
 Planetes - Dolf Azaria
 Please Teacher! - Minoru Edajima
 Rave Master - Lance of the Beast Sword
 Robotech - Rolf Emerson
 Robotech II: The Sentinels - T.R. Edwards
 Saint Tail - Mr. Kaido
 Saiyuki Gunlock - Demon, Head Priest, Villager
 Samurai Champloo - Manzo the Saw
 Scrapped Princess - Alec, Playhouse Owner, Customer
 s-CRY-ed - Unkei
 The Seven Deadly Sins - Bartra Lyonesse, Twigo
 Shinzo - Various
 Stellvia - Sergei Roskov, Umihito Katase
 Street Fighter Alpha: Generations - Goutetsu
 Tales of Phantasia: The Animation - Mars
 Teknoman - Lance, Ringo
 Texhnolyze - Kimata Motoharu
 The Melancholy of Haruhi Suzumiya - Okabe-sensei, Kiyosumi Morimura, Shamisen (Season 2)
 Transformers: Robots in Disguise - Hotshot, Ironhide
 Trigun - Chapel the Evergreen, Ingway
 Tenchi Muyo! GXP - Minami Kuramitsu, Mr. Kaunaq, Wau Shaman
 Tenchi Muyo! Ryo-Ohki - D3, Minami Kuramitsu
 Tsukihime, Lunar Legend - Makihisa Tohno, Doctor, Male announcer
 Ultra Maniac - Butler, Nina's Grandfather
 Vampire Hunter D - D, D's Left Hand
 Vampire Princess Miyu - Mr. Shigere
 Vandread - Hibiki's Grandfather
 Vandread: The Second Stage - Doyen, Man
 Windaria - King Draco
 Witch Hunter Robin - Cornelli / Professor / Kazuma Karata
 X - Kyogou Monou
 Ys - Slaff
 YS-II - Sada Hadat
 Zatch Bell! - Li-Akron the Crime Lord
 Zillion: Burning Night - Rick

Animation 

 Avatar: The Last Airbender - Various
 Bureau of Alien Detectors - Ben Packard
 Creepy Crawlers - Additional Voices
 G.I. Joe: A Real American Hero - Cross-Country
 Inspector Mouse - Inspector Mouse
 Iznogoud - Genie
 Jin Jin and the Panda Patrol - Various
 RedHand Animation - Narrator
 Oliver Twist - Various
 The 13 Ghosts of Scooby-Doo - The Mirror Demon (ep. 4)
 The Real Ghostbusters - Steve Jennings
 The Return of Dogtanian - Narrator
 The Transformers - Cosmos, Tracks
 The Wisdom of The Gnomes - Narrator
 Visionaries: Knights of the Magical Light - Ectar, Lexor
 Walter Melon - Sneero (season 1)
 Zentrix - Emperor Jarad/Dark General/Quantum

Live-action 

 Adventures in Voice Acting - Himself
 Black Lightning - Prof. Viktor Kuptsov (English dub)
 The Hallo Spencer Show - Poldi (voice, uncredited)
 Mighty Morphin Power Rangers - Gork (voice, uncredited), Repellator (voice, uncredited)
 Marseille - Robert Taro (Gérard Depardieu, English dub)
 Masked Rider - Gork (voice)
 Passions - Detective
 The District - "The Greenhouse Effect" - Max Cartwright
 Beetleborgs Metallix - Mole Monster (voice)
 Power Rangers: Turbo - Strikeout (voice, uncredited)
 Power Rangers: Lost Galaxy - Motor Mantis (voice)
 Power Rangers: Lightspeed Rescue - Mantevil (voice)
 Power Rangers: Wild Force - Narrator (Opening)
 VR Troopers - Fiddlebot (voice)
 Versus - Detective (English dub)
 Violetta - Herman (English dub)

Film 

 Akira (Pioneer/Animaze) - Resistance Member 2 
 A Turtle's Tale 2: Sammy's Escape from Paradise - Security Guard
 Cardcaptor Sakura: The Movie 2 - The Sealed Card - Fujitaka Kinomoto
 The Bike Squad - Stan Jackson
 The Castle of Cagliostro - Count Cagliostro (Streamline version)
 Cromartie High - The Movie - Shinichi Mechazawa, Narrator
 The Dog of Flanders - Mr. Cogetz
 Fate/stay night: Unlimited Blade Works - Berserker
 Little Big Panda - Mr. Teng
 Fist of the North Star movie - Shin
 Fly Me to the Moon - American Newscaster
 Frog-g-g! - Huntley Grimes
 G.I. Joe: The Movie - Cross Country
 Jungle Shuffle - Helms
 Lupin The 3rd: The Movie - The Secret of Mamo - Special Agent Gordon
 Little Nemo: Adventures in Slumberland - Etiquette Master
 The Little Polar Bear - Mika
 Naruto the Movie: Ninja Clash in the Land of Snow - Director Makino
 Redline - Machine Head
 Sakura Wars: The Movie - Yoritsune Hanakouji
 Scream Bloody Murder - Principal Burden
 Teenage Mutant Ninja Turtles/Teenage Mutant Ninja Turtles II: The Secret of the Ooze - Master Tatsu (voice)
 The Adventures of Panda Warrior - Captain
 Tiger and Bunny: The Rising - Johnny Wong
 Zeiram 2 - Kamiya

Video games 

 .hack//G.U. series - Sirius
 Vol.1//Rebirth
 Vol.2//Reminisce
 Vol.3//Redemption
 Ancient Quest of Saqqarah - Khufu
 Battleship - Commander Alan Colder
 Bleach: Soul Resurrección - Baraggan Louisenbairn
 Blue Dragon - Jiro's Father, Marumaro's Father, Yasato
 Boogerman: A Pick and Flick Adventure - Boogerman
 Call of Duty 3 - Narrator
 Crackdown trilogy (2007–2019) - Director Charles Goodwin
 Dead or Alive: Dimensions - Raidou
 Diablo II - Necromancer/Warrior/Warriv
 Diablo III - Rondal- Act 3 Soldier
 Supreme Commander - Berry - UEF Commander
 Eureka Seven Vol. 1: The New Wave - Captain Pete Saville (uncredited)
 Final Fantasy IV - FuSoYa, Cagnazzo
 Final Fantasy XI - Intro FMV Narrator
 Final Fantasy Crystal Chronicles: The Crystal Bearers - Jegran
 Hearthstone - Uther the Lightbringer, The Lich King, Kel'Thuzad (Archlich), Various minions
 Heroes of the Storm - Uther the Lightbringer, The Lich King, Kel'Thuzad (Archlich), Xul (Necromancer), Deathwing
 Infex - Kendall
 Lost Planet 2 - Additional voices
 Metal Gear Solid: Peace Walker - Soldiers/Extras
 ModNation Racers - Chief
 Mortal Kombat series
 Mortal Kombat vs. DC Universe - Kano
 Mortal Kombat - Kano, Ermac
 Mortal Kombat X - Kano
 NCIS: The Video Game - Trevor Gates
 Ninja Gaiden 3/Ninja Gaiden 3: Razor's Edge - Ken Ishigami
 Phantasmat - The Hotel Owner
 Rave Master - Lance
 Red Faction: Guerrilla - Red Faction Commander
 Rune Factory: Tides of Destiny - Bacchus
 Sengoku Basara: Samurai Heroes - Shingen Takeda
 Seven Samurai 20XX - Kambei
 Shadow Hearts: Covenant - Minister Ishimura
 Star Ocean: First Departure - Ashlay Bernbeldt
 Street Fighter IV/Super Street Fighter IV/Super Street Fighter IV: Arcade Edition/Ultra Street Fighter IV - Seth
 Street Fighter V - Seth, Daigo Kazama
 The Last Remnant - Ludope
 Transformers: Armada The Game - Bruticus
 Warcraft III: Reign of Chaos - Uther the Lightbringer, Kel'Thuzad
 World of Warcraft - Kel'Thuzad
 World of Warcraft: The Burning Crusade - Epoch Hunter, Aeonus, Legionnaire 03, High Warlord Naj'entus
 World of Warcraft: Wrath of the Lich King - The Lich King, King Ymiron, Commander Kolurg, Uther the Lightbringer
 World of Warcraft: Cataclysm - Deathwing
 World of Warcraft: Mists of Pandaria - Sergeant VerdoneWorld of Warcraft: Shadowlands - Uther the Lightbringer
 X-Morph: Defense - General
 Xenosaga Episode II - Margulis
 Xenosaga Episode III - Margulis

 Staff credits 

 Voice director 
 Berserk Cyborg 009: Call of Justice Descent to Undermountain Seven Knights 
 Star Trek: 25th Anniversary Enhanced Star Trek: Judgment Rites Stonekeep Transformers: Robots in Disguise Script writer 

 Aldnoah.Zero Around the World in 80 Dreams Beetleborgs Metallix Bleach Bob in a Bottle Bumpety Boo Chobits Creepy Crawlers Digimon: Digital Monsters Fate/stay night: Unlimited Blade Works Flint the Time Detective Gad Guard Grimm's Fairy Tale Classics Gulliver's Travels Hello Kitty's Paradise I'm Telling! Iznogoud Jin Jin and the Panda Patrol JoJo's Bizarre Adventure Jungle Tales Little Mouse on the Prairie Lunar Legend Tsukihime Maple Town Mars Daybreak Masked Rider Maya the Bee Mighty Morphin' Power Rangers Mon Colle Knights Noozles Ox Tales Phoenix Princess Tenko Saban's Adventures of Peter Pan Saban's Adventures of Pinocchio Saban's Adventures of the Little Mermaid Samurai Pizza Cats Sandokan s-CRY-ed Shinzo The Littl' Bits The Seven Deadly Sins 
 The Wisdom of The Gnomes Transformers: Robots in Disguise VR Troopers Wowser Casting director 
 Descent to Undermountain Star Trek: Judgment Rites Star Trek: 25th Anniversary Enhanced Stonekeep Internet series 
 Star Trek: Odyssey 1x05, "Keepers of the Wind" - Overseer Liendo
 Star Trek: The Helena Chronicles'' 1x03, "Letter of the Law" - Sidron

References

External links 

 
 
 
 Interview with Michael McConnohie and Melodee Spevack
 VoxWorks

20th-century American male actors
21st-century American male actors
Living people
American male voice actors
American male video game actors
American television writers
American male television writers
American casting directors
American voice directors
Year of birth missing (living people)